Montezuma-Cortez High School  (M-CHS) is a public senior high school located in Cortez, Colorado, United States, serving 721 students in grades 9–12. It is part of the Montezuma-Cortez School District RE-1.

The first high school was constructed in Cortez in 1909. The Cortez School (known also as the Calkins School) became a junior high school in 1946, when Montezuma County High School opened. The next Montezuma-Cortez High School was constructed on 14-acres in 1967, and the old high school became the middle school. The Calkins School served as an administration building. The new $33.9 million high school broke ground December 21, 2013 on a 35-acres site and was completed in the summer of 2015 through generous donations and grants from the community and state.

Athletics

In baseball and boys' basketball, MCHS competes in the Colorado High School Activities Association (CHSAA), 5A/4A Southwestern Conference with Durango High School, Montrose High School, Fruita Monument High School, Grand Junction High School, and Central High School.

In football and soccer, MCHS competes in the 3A Western Slope Conference.

Montezuma-Cortez state championships

MCHS has captured three state championships, two in 4A and one in 2A.

Notable alumni

 Larry Brunson - National Football League player
 Scott Tipton - United States Congressman

See also

 Education in the United States

References

Public high schools in Colorado
Education in Montezuma County, Colorado